Chilton Jennings was lynched on July 24, 1919, after being accused of attacking a white woman, Mrs. Virgie Haggard in Gilmer, Texas.

Lynching of Chilton Jennings
 
In Gilmer, Upshur County, Texas a 28-year-old Chilton Jennings allegedly assaulted a white woman, Mrs. Virgie Haggard, leaving her in critical condition. A posse caught him  from Glimer. He was arrested and a mob of about 1,000 white people stormed the jail and broke down the door with sledgehammers. A noose was placed around his neck and he was dragged by horse to the town square where he was hanged. The mob worked quietly and quickly dispersed after he was killed. The body hung all day before being cut down at 4 o’clock July 25.  Four people were later arrested for the lynching; murder indictments were served for Willie Howell, Charlie Lansdale, Fritz Boyd, and Francis Flanagan.

Aftermath

These race riots were one of several incidents of civil unrest that began in the so-called American Red Summer of 1919, which included terrorist attacks on black communities and white oppression in over three dozen cities and counties. In most cases, white mobs attacked African American neighborhoods. In some cases, black community groups resisted the attacks, especially in Chicago and Washington DC. Most deaths occurred in rural areas during events like the Elaine Race Riot in Arkansas, where an estimated 100 to 240 black people and 5 white people were killed. Also in 1919 were the Chicago Race Riot and Washington D.C. race riot which killed 38 and 39 people respectively. Both had many more non-fatal injuries and extensive property damage reaching into the millions of dollars.

See also 

 Texarkana, Texas riot of 1919
 Port Arthur riot 1919
 Longview race riot

Bibliography 
Notes

References
  

  

1919 deaths
1919 murders in the United States
Deaths by firearm in Texas
Lynching deaths in Texas
People murdered in Texas
Male murder victims
1919 crimes in the United States
1919 in Texas
1919 riots in the United States
July 1919 events
African-American history of Texas
Riots and civil disorder in Texas
White American riots in the United States
Racially motivated violence against African Americans
Red Summer
History of Texas